The fifth World Cup of Softball was held in Oklahoma City, Oklahoma USA between July 22 and July 26, 2010.  USA won their fourth World Cup by defeating Japan 5-1 in the Championship game.

Final standings

Preliminary round

Position Round

Teams

 Futures

External links
 USA softball website

World Cup of Softball
World Cup Of Softball, 2010